"Fly By II" is a song by English boy band Blue. It was released on 18 March 2002 as the fourth single from their debut studio album, All Rise (2001). The release includes the band's first non-album exclusive, "Love R.I.P". "Fly By II" is a remixed version of the All Rise album track "Fly By", which samples the song "Rise" by Herb Alpert, while the remix samples from the Notorious B.I.G.'s "Hypnotize". The remix reached number six on the UK Singles Chart.

Music video
The video for "Fly by II" features Blue in a 2001 BMW X5 (E53) 4.4i, driving to an underground hangout, where the patrons partake in breakdancing, dominoes and rap battling. The members of Blue then proceed to go upstairs to a rave club, where they dance while performing. The video featured an appearance by Ricky Whittle.

Track listings

UK and New Zealand CD single
 "Fly By II" – 3:48
 "All Rise" (acoustic) – 3:40
 "Love R.I.P." – 3:38

UK cassette single and European CD single
 "Fly By II" – 3:48
 "Megamix" – 6:56

UK DVD single
 "Fly By II" (video) – 3:49
 "This Temptation" (Blacksmith RnB radio rub) – 4:31
 "A Year in the Life of..." 1:30

European CD single
 "Fly By" – 3:48
 "Love R.I.P." – 3:38

Australian CD single
 "Fly By II" – 3:49
 "All Rise" (acoustic version) – 3:40
 "Love R.I.P." – 3:38
 "This Temptation" (Blacksmith RnB rub) – 4:30
 "Megamix" – 6:56

Credits and personnel
Credits are taken from the All Rise album booklet.

Studios
 Recorded and mixed at StarGate Studios (Norway)
 Vocals recorded at Metropolis Studios (London, England)
 Additional vocals recorded at Studio 1 (Oslo, Norway)
 Mastered at Sterling Sound (New York City) and Sony Music Studios (London, England)

Personnel

 StarGate – production
 Mikkel SE – writing, all instruments
 Hallgeir Rustan – writing, all instruments
 Tor Erik Hermansen – writing, all instruments
 Simon Webbe – writing

 Blue – all vocals
 Neil Tucker – engineering
 Chris Sansom – additional vocals engineering
 Tom Coyne – mastering
 John Davis – mastering

Charts

Weekly charts

Year-end charts

Certifications and sales

Release history

References

2001 songs
2002 singles
Blue (English band) songs
Innocent Records singles
Music videos directed by Jake Nava
Song recordings produced by Stargate (record producers)
Songs written by Hallgeir Rustan
Songs written by Mikkel Storleer Eriksen
Songs written by Simon Webbe
Songs written by Tor Erik Hermansen
Virgin Records singles